Adel Khodhor Hafedh Al-Musawi (born 1 July 1954, better known as  Adel Khudhair, is an Iraqi football coach and former international player. He played as a defender and midfielder. He was born in Basra.

International posts
Khudhair appeared at the World Military Cup 1977, and also played in the Moscow Olympics in 1980. He played in  5th Arabian Gulf Cup in 1979 and scored two goals, the first goal against  Emirates, and the second against Oman.

Political aspect
In 1982, the Iraqi Ba'athist government overthrew Khudhair out the  national team after they learned that his brother (Shaker) belonged to the Dawa party. His brother was then assassinated with his son (Mahmoud) by the government and Khudhair was subsequently placed under house arrest.

After the outbreak of the 1991 uprising in Basra, Khudhair took part in a military operation and was seriously injured. He was taken to Kuwait, then to Iran and treated in hospital. And then returned to join the Iraqi opposition front through Patriotic Union of Kurdistan until the 2003 invasion of Iraq.

Coaching career
Since 2003, Khudhair has been a professional coach in Bahrain, where he has trained many Bahraini clubs and achieved excellent results with them, including Al-Malkiya, Al-Tadhamun, Al-Etifaq and  East Riffa Club. Khudhair was named coach of Al-Hawija Sc in the summer of 2021 and led the team to a successful 2021/2022 season by gaining promotion to the Iraqi Division One for the 2022/2023 season.

International goals
Scores and results table. Iraq's goal tally first:

|}

Honors

Local
Al-Zawraa
 Iraqi Premier League: 1977, 1979.
 Iraq FA Cup: 1979, 1981, 1982.

International
Iraq
 1977 World Men's Military Cup: Champion
 1979 Arabian Gulf Cup: Champion

Notes

References
  Iraqi national team players database
 The history of Iraqi football, 1979
  The history of Iraqi football, 1981
 Adel Khudhair clips: Interview in June 2016,  Khudhair's goal in 1979 against Emirates
Al-Minaa Club: Sailors of south

1954 births
Living people
Association football midfielders
Iraqi footballers
Al-Mina'a SC players
Al-Zawraa SC players
Sportspeople from Basra
Iraq international footballers
1976 AFC Asian Cup players
Olympic footballers of Iraq
Footballers at the 1980 Summer Olympics
Iraqi football managers
Expatriate football managers in Bahrain
East Riffa Club managers
Malkiya Club managers